Mikalay Barsukow (born 30 November 1982) is a Belarusian former professional footballer who last played for Isloch Minsk Raion.

External links

1982 births
Living people
Belarusian footballers
Association football defenders
Belarusian expatriate footballers
Expatriate footballers in Poland
Belarusian expatriate sportspeople in Poland
FC Dinamo-Juni Minsk players
FC Dinamo Minsk players
FC Vitebsk players
FC Naftan Novopolotsk players
FC Belshina Bobruisk players
FC Smorgon players
FC Torpedo-BelAZ Zhodino players
FC Gomel players
Olimpia Elbląg players
ŁKS Łódź players
FC Rechitsa-2014 players
FC Isloch Minsk Raion players